Yushui Subdistrict is a subdistrict in Dejiang County, Guizhou, China. , it has 7 residential communities and 6 villages under its administration.

See also 
 List of township-level divisions of Guizhou

References 

Subdistricts of Guizhou
Dejiang County